Just One Night is a 2000 American comedy film written and directed by Alan Jacobs.

Plot 
An earnest groom-to-be (Timothy Hutton) seeks his lost shoe all over the city through a series of increasingly crazy exploits, with the help of an unhappily married woman (Maria Grazia Cucinotta).

Cast 

 Timothy Hutton:  Isaac Alder 
 Maria Grazia Cucinotta: Aurora 
 Udo Kier: Walter Lert 
 Natalie Shaw: Tali 
 Michael O'Keefe: Wayne 
 Seymour Cassel:  	Arthur Imperial  
 Robert Easton: Drunk Cab Driver 
 Don Novello:  Italian Drifter

References

External links

2000 comedy films
2000 films
Films directed by Alan Jacobs
American comedy films
Films scored by Anthony Marinelli
2000s English-language films
2000s American films